DG may refer to:

Arts and entertainment
 Death Grips, an American experimental hip hop group
 DG (character), in the science fiction series Tin Man
 Dial Global, a radio network
 Dragon Gate, a Japanese professional wrestling promotion
 Drain Gang, a Swedish rap group

Business and organizations
 Data General, a minicomputer manufacturer
 DG Flugzeugbau, a German airplane manufacturer
 Desnoes & Geddes, DG, D&G, a Jamaican brand of soft drinks 
 Deutsche Grammophon, a classical music record label
 Dial Global, a radio network
 Dolce & Gabbana, an Italian luxury fashion design
 Dollar General, an American variety store (NYSE ticker DG)
Delta Gamma, a women's fraternity

Places
 DG postcode area, the Dumfries and Galloway postcode area in Scotland
 Danilovgrad, a municipality in Montenegro, abbreviated DG on car plates
 German-speaking Community of Belgium
 Diego Garcia, exceptionally reserved ISO 3166-1 alpha-2 country code for

Science, mathematics and technology
 Decigram, a unit of measure
 Dentate gyrus, a brain structure
 Diglyme, an organic solvent
 Directional gyroscope, a heading indicator use in aircraft
 Discontinuous Galerkin method, a numerical method
 Distributed generation of energy

Transport
 Cebgo, formerly South East Asian Airlines, SEAir, Tigerair Philippines; IATA code
 Dindigul Junction railway station, Tamil Nadu, India; Indian Railways station code

Other uses
 DG (footballer) (born 2001), Douglas da Silva Teixeira, Brazilian footballer
 Dei gratia (Latin: "By the grace of God"), abbreviated D.G.
 Deo gratias (Latin: "Thanks be to God").
 Dangerous goods
 Differential geometry
 Director-general
 Directorate-General, a type of specialised administrative body in the European Union